Holly Ridge is an unincorporated community in Sunflower County, Mississippi. It is located in the Mississippi Delta, approximately five miles west of Indianola.

Blues history
The early Delta blues guitarist and singer, Charley Patton (1891–1934), is buried in Holly Ridge. The Mississippi Blues Trail placed its first historic marker on Patton's grave in dedication to his iconic status as a bluesman. Fellow blues musicians, Willie James Foster (1921–2001) and Asie Payton (1937–1997), the latter of whom lived in the community, are also buried in the same cemetery.

References

External links
Photo Charley Patton's grave

Unincorporated communities in Sunflower County, Mississippi
Unincorporated communities in Mississippi
Mississippi Blues Trail